Henry Olufosoye Makinwa (born 6 November 1977) is a Nigerian retired footballer who played as a forward.

A journeyman, he represented 17 clubs in 11 countries during his professional career (his own included).

Club career

Early years / Portugal
After playing for three teams in his homeland, Makinwa moved abroad at the age of 19, his first stop being Rayo Vallecano in the Spanish second division. In the following transfer window, without having appeared officially for the club, he signed for F.C. Penafiel in Portugal, in the same level.

Makinwa (known in Portugal as Maki) spent the following four-and-a-half seasons in the country, mostly for Vitória de Setúbal. In the 2000–01 campaign he scored a career-best – in Europe – eight goals in 28 games, as the Sadinos returned to the Primeira Liga immediately after being relegated; in late February 2003, he left S.C. Farense and switched to Romania with FC Rapid București.

Gretna
Over the course of the following four seasons, Makinwa never settled with a team, playing in Egypt, Portugal, Cyprus, Israel and China. On 8 November 2007, he signed for newly promoted Scottish Premier League side Gretna on a free transfer, following his release from Chinese Super League's Tianjin Teda FC.

Makinwa made his competitive debut on 25 November 2007 against Hearts, playing the full 90 minutes in a 1–1 home draw, with Laryea Kingston scoring at both ends. He failed to score any goal in 14 official appearances and, after Gretna's relegation and dissolve, found himself again a free agent.

Late career
In October 2009, after spending one year in Indonesia, Makinwa joined Maltese First Division team Vittoriosa Stars F.C. on a free transfer.

Honours

Rapid București
Liga I: 2002–03
Supercupa României: 2003
Al Ahly
Egyptian Premier League: 2004–05

References

External links

1977 births
Living people
Sportspeople from Lagos
Nigerian footballers
Association football forwards
Nigeria Professional Football League players
Heartland F.C. players
Rayo Vallecano players
Primeira Liga players
Liga Portugal 2 players
F.C. Penafiel players
Vitória F.C. players
Gil Vicente F.C. players
S.C. Farense players
C.D. Feirense players
Liga I players
FC Rapid București players
Al Ahly SC players
Cypriot First Division players
AEP Paphos FC players
Israeli Premier League players
Maccabi Petah Tikva F.C. players
Chinese Super League players
Tianjin Jinmen Tiger F.C. players
Scottish Premier League players
Gretna F.C. players
Liga 1 (Indonesia) players
PSMS Medan players
Vittoriosa Stars F.C. players
Nigerian expatriate footballers
Expatriate footballers in Spain
Expatriate footballers in Portugal
Expatriate footballers in Romania
Expatriate footballers in Egypt
Expatriate footballers in Cyprus
Expatriate footballers in Israel
Expatriate footballers in China
Expatriate footballers in Scotland
Expatriate footballers in Indonesia
Expatriate footballers in Malta
Nigerian expatriate sportspeople in Portugal
Nigerian expatriate sportspeople in Romania
Egyptian Premier League players